The 2019 Wexford Senior Hurling Championship was the 109th staging of the Wexford Senior Hurling Championship since its establishment by the Wexford County Board in 1889. The championship began on 12 April 2019 and ended on 27 October 2019.

Naomh Éanna were the defending champions; however, they were defeated by Ferns St Aidan's at the quarter-final stage.

On 27 October 2019, St Martin's won the championship after a 1-15 to 1-12 defeat of St Anne's Rathangan in the final at Innovate Wexford Park. This was their fourth championship title overall and their first title since 2017.

Team changes

To Championship

Promoted from the Wexford Intermediate Hurling Championship
 Fethard St Mogue's

From Championship

Relegated to the Wexford Intermediate Hurling Championship
 Buffers Alley

Results

Group A

Table

Group A results

Group B

Table

Group B results

Knock-out stage

Relegation play-off

Quarter-finals

Semi-finals

Final

Championship statistics

Miscellaneous

 The Rapparees–Rathnure and St Anne's Rathangan–Shelmaliers quarter-final double-header scheduled for Innovate Wexford Park on 22 September 2019 were postponed due a waterlogged pitch.

References

Wexford Senior Hurling Championship
Wexford Senior Hurling Championship
Wexford Senior Hurling Championship